Diana Lachatanere is an American archivist.  She retired from the Schomburg Center for Research in Black Culture, The New York Public Library in 2013, where she held the position of Assistant Director for Collections and Services from 1995 to 2013, and Curator of the Manuscripts, Archives and Rare Books Division from 1988 to 2013.

Career 
In 1984, Lachatenere was involved in an appeal case for arguing that she was denied the position of Head Archivist at the Rare Books Manuscripts and Archives Section of the Schomburg Center for Research in Black Culture. It was ruled that the reasoning was lack of qualifications.

Lachateñeré worked at Schomburg in various roles, including Assistant Director of Collections and Services and Manager of the Scholars-in-Residence Program. While managing collections at Schomburg, she was heavily involved in many notable projects, including African and African Diaspora Transformations in the 20th Century. She served as Division Curator for the Schomburg-Mellon Humanities Institute, which encourages minorities and others interested in African-American studies to pursue degrees in the humanities.

She has served as a consultant on many different archival programs including the Center for Black Music Research; Institute for the Study of History, Life and Culture of Black People at Jackson State University; Jazz Heritage Project at Medgar Evers College; and the Cuban Archives Project of the Cuban Research Institute, Florida International University.

In addition, Lachateñeré served as a Collection Manager for the In Motion: The African-American Migration Experience Project, an extensive research project through Schomburg. She was also a member of the processing team of the Lorraine Hansberry Papers at Schomburg.

Involvement with SAA 
Lachatanere's first Society of American Archivists meeting was in 1978 when the meeting was held in Nashville, TN.  Ann Allen Shockley, the librarian and archivist at Fisk University, had served on the Program committee and shepherded several sessions which included African American panelists.  During the conference she invited "all of us, all of the young, people of color to her house for dinner … She made it very clear that this was the first time the Society had this number of black people there.” However, it wasn't until 1981 that a roundtable was created specifically for minorities in archival work.

The idea came out of the session "Minorities and the Profession: An Agenda for Action," (1981) chaired by Harold Pinkett, where Lachatenere was a panelist. After the session, archivists including Archie Motley, Thomas Battle, John Fleckner and Danny Williams, began to talk about next steps, including the drafting of a resolution. Members approved the resolution and the Task Force on Minorities was created. Thomas Battle was appointed as the chairman, with Diana Lachateñeré invited as the SAA representative for the Joint Committee on Minority Recruitment. In 1984, she was elected to the Nominations Committee and was appointed to the Membership Committee.

The task force continued to argue for a membership committee. Lachateñeré stated in the same interview, “the reason why we were pushing a membership committee is because then, out of the membership committee you could put together a recruitment program that could in fact target, we would target everybody, but we could specifically target black folks...”

In 1987 the task force ended with the recommendation that a minorities' roundtable be formed. The Archivists and Archives of Color Roundtable was established later that year, with Diana Lachateñeré and Carol Rudisell serving as the initial coordinators for the roundtable. Diana served as co-editor and prepared the first two newsletters for the roundtable and helped to set an agenda for the group. The roundtable held its first meeting in September 1987 at the annual SAA conference in New York City. This meeting brought a structure for the roundtable that continues today, including the process of electing two co-chairs, with one being elected every year.

Publications 

 Blacks in the Railroad Industry Collection, 1946-1954 (1980), Finding Aid
 Preliminary Listing of the San Francisco Manuscript Collections, California Historical Society (1980)
 Interview with Katherine Stewart Flippin: Schlesinger Library Black Women Oral History Project (1981)
 Naomi Anderson Johnson, San Francisco Public Library (1979)

References 

Year of birth missing (living people)
Living people
African-American historians
Female archivists
American historians
American women historians
American archivists
American librarians
American women librarians
21st-century African-American people
21st-century African-American women
African-American women writers